Out of Control: The New Biology of Machines, Social Systems, and the Economic World is a 1992 book by Kevin Kelly. Major themes in Out of Control are cybernetics, emergence, self-organization, complex systems, negentropy and chaos theory and it can be seen as a work of techno-utopianism.

Summary
The central theme of the book is that several fields of contemporary science and philosophy point in the same direction: intelligence is not organized in a centralized structure but much more like a bee-hive of small simple components. Kelly applies this view to bureaucratic organizations, intelligent computers as well as to the human brain.

Reception
The book was not widely reviewed when first released in 1992, but got visibly reviewed and extensively cited during the next several years. Reviews often discussed Kelly's hive-mind analogy as a metaphor for the New Economy.

Reviewers have called this book a "mind-expanding exploration" (Publishers Weekly) and "the best of an important new genre" (Forbes ASAP).

Critics of the book have contended that its position leaves us without a critical approach to politics and social power.

References

Further reading
 The book's homepage (includes the complete book online)

1992 non-fiction books
1992 in the environment
Systems theory books
Works about technology
Futurology books
Collective intelligence